"No You Didn't, No You Don't" is the fifth single released by indie rock band The Courteeners, it is from their debut studio album St. Jude. It was released on 23 June 2008 on a CD single and two 7 inch singles reaching #35 in the UK Singles Chart.

Lyrical meaning
The lyrics supposedly describe a previous girlfriend claiming that she broke (presumably) Fray's heart and that she knows him better than any other, and seems to look down on him for his ambitions in relation to music, while Fray counters this with the argument that he's a lot more sophisticated and intelligent than he is given credit for and will one day have more success than predicted.

Chart performance
The single was released on 23 June 2008 and managed to enter the UK Singles Chart at a peak of #35, making it The Courteeners' third UK Top 40 entry.

Track listing
 CD
 "No You Didn't, No You Don't"
 "I'm Sticking With You" (Velvet Underground cover)
 "About You Now" (live Sugababes cover)
 "Dream a Little Dream of Me" (The Mamas & the Papas cover)

 7" (1)
 "No You Didn't, No You Don't"
 "New Romantic" (Laura Marling cover)

 7" (2)
 "No You Didn't, No You Don't"
 "Out to Get You" (James cover)

References

2008 singles
The Courteeners songs
2008 songs
Song recordings produced by Stephen Street
Polydor Records singles
Songs written by Liam Fray